Austroaeschna speciosa is a species of dragonfly in the family Telephlebiidae, 
known as the tropical unicorn darner. It is known to be present only in the mountainous regions of north-east Queensland, Australia. It appears very similar to the more widespread Austroaeschna unicornis (unicorn darner) which inhabits areas in southern Queensland, New South Wales, Victoria and Tasmania.

Description
The tropical unicorn darner is a large dragonfly with a body length around 80mm and wing-span of 100mm. The abdomen on segments 3 to 8 is black and reddish-brown, heavily marked with pale yellow spots or patches. The synthorax is reddish-brown with prominent yellow stripes darkly outlined. The prominent eyes are pale grey to green, meeting at the top of the head.
The wings are clear and the pterostigma are yellow.

Habitat
The tropical unicorn darner inhabits rocky sections of stream and rivers.

Gallery

Notes
The Australian Biological Resources Study has Austroaeschna speciosa listed as a species in the family Telephlebiidae, with the synonym of Austroaeschna (Austroaeschna) speciosa.
The Catalogue of Life has the tropical unicorn darner listed as a subspecies of Austroaeschna unicornis in the family Aeshnidae.

References

Telephlebiidae
Odonata of Australia
Endemic fauna of Australia
Taxa named by Bror Yngve Sjöstedt
Insects described in 1917